Psychromarinibacter is a Gram-negative, strictlyaerobic and motile genus of bacteria from the family of Rhodobacteraceae with one known species (Psychromarinibacter halotolerans). Psychromarinibacter halotolerans has been isolated from seawater from the Yellow Sea.

References

Rhodobacteraceae
Bacteria genera
Monotypic bacteria genera